Tunnel vision metaphorically denotes the reluctance to consider alternatives to one's preferred line of thought; instances may include physicians treating patients, detectives considering crime suspects, or anyone predisposed to a favored outcome. The common way to solve this problem is a second opinion, that is, getting somebody unrelated to the original investigation to look at it from the beginning, without the same biases and preconceptions. This is generally due to bias from preceding incidents.

See also
 Cognitive bias
 Reality tunnel

References

Philosophical phrases
Metaphors referring to objects
Consequentialism
Quotations from philosophy